Egon Andreasson  (September 17, 1910 – August 22, 1983) was a Swedish politician. He was a member of the Centre Party and member of Swedish parliament (upper chamber) 1969–1970.

Members of the Riksdag from the Centre Party (Sweden)
1910 births
1983 deaths
Members of the Första kammaren
20th-century Swedish politicians